Cochlostoma hellenicum is a species of small land snail with an operculum, a terrestrial gastropod mollusc in the family Cochlostomatidae.

Taxonomy
Fauna Europaea recognises two subspecies, the nominotypical C. h. subsp. hellenicum and C. h. subsp. athenarum.

Geographic distribution 
C. hellenicum is endemic to Greece, where it occurs in the central part of the country and the islands of Tinos, Evvia and Xeronisi.

References

Diplommatinidae
Molluscs of Europe
Endemic fauna of Greece